Salome of the Tenements is a 1925 American silent drama film adapted to the screen by Sonya Levien from the Anzia Yezierska novel of the same name. Made by Jesse L. Lasky and Adolph Zukor's Famous Players-Lasky Corporation, a division of Paramount Pictures, it was directed by Sidney Olcott and starred Jetta Goudal and Godfrey Tearle.

The film, which was inspired by accounts of the real life of Rose Pastor Stokes, tells the story of poor immigrants living in New York's Jewish Lower East Side. It was shot at the Paramount Astoria studios.

Plot
As described in a film magazine review, Sonya Mendel (Goudal) works at a Jewish newspaper. She interviews John Manning (Tearle) on the erection of a new settlement. He invites her to dinner and she borrows clothes from Jakey Salomon (Ruben) so that she looks presentable. She also borrows money from Banker Ben (Tenenholz) and in return she gives a note promising to repay $150 when she marries Manning. After she is married, Ben threatens to show Manning the note unless she "calls him off" from prosecuting Ben. When he learns of the note, Manning forgives his wife.

Cast

Death of Fanny Weintraub
The movie used several elderly extras who were residents at the Home of Old Israel. The residents were told the morning of the premier that they were invited to attend, to see Fanny Weintraub's performance. Mrs. Weintraub was overwhelmed and died from the excitement.

Preservation
With no prints of Salome of the Tenements located in any film archives, it is a lost film.

References

External links

 Salome of the Tenements website dedicated to Sidney Olcott

1925 films
American silent feature films
Films directed by Sidney Olcott
American black-and-white films
American romantic drama films
Famous Players-Lasky films
American films based on actual events
Films based on American novels
Lost American films
Films with screenplays by Sonya Levien
1925 romantic drama films
Films based on works by Anzia Yezierska
1920s American films
Silent romantic drama films
Silent American drama films